Nanosaphes is a Neotropical genus of water scavenger beetle in the family Hydrophilidae represented by seven described species known from the Guiana Shield Region.

Taxonomy 
The genus Nanosaphes was described for the first time by Girón & Short in 2018.

It belongs in the subfamily Acidocerinae and contains seven described species from Brazil (Pará), Guyana, and Suriname.

Description 
Tiny beetles (1.15–1.45 mm), smooth and shiny dorsally, yellowish-brown to dark brown in coloration, with long maxillary palps. The most salient characteristic of the genus is the minute size of its members. A complete diagnosis was presented by Girón and Short.

Habitat 
According to Girón and Short "Species are associated with stream margins, particularly where there are marginal banks of sand and roots.".

Species 

 Nanosaphes castaneus Girón and Short, 2018
 Nanosaphes hesperus Girón and Short, 2018
 Nanosaphes punctatus Girón and Short, 2018
 Nanosaphes tricolor Girón and Short, 2018

References 

Hydrophilidae
Insects of South America
Insects described in 2018